Thaneswar Boro is an Asom Gana Parishad politician from Assam. He has been elected to Assam Legislative Assembly  from Rangiya. In 2016, he founded a new political outfit called Asom Gana Parishad (Anchalik).

References 

Living people
Asom Gana Parishad politicians
Assam MLAs 2016–2021
People from Kamrup district
Year of birth missing (living people)